Victory Day, also known as Turkish Armed Forces Day, is a public holiday in Turkey commemorating the decisive victory in the Battle of Dumlupınar, on 30 August 1922. It is also observed by Northern Cyprus.

Background
The holiday commemorates the decisive victory in the Battle of Dumlupınar, the last battle in the Greco-Turkish War, on 30 August 1922. Following the battle, Greek presence in Anatolia ended. Victory Day has been celebrated as an official holiday since 1926, and was first celebrated on 30 August 1923.

Customs
Victory Day is celebrated across Turkey and in Northern Cyprus and is a celebration of the Turkish Armed Forces. The main celebration is held at Anıtkabir in Ankara, where the President of Turkey leads officials in laying wreaths and then delivers a speech. 
The unofficial main celebration among citizens usually takes place in Izmir - a city that is associated with Atatürk and his achievements. Izmir is a city that has been directly affected by Greek invasions. Many people of this city are originally Turks from Greek cities.
A ceremony is also held at the War Academy in Istanbul, with all military promotions made on this day, while parades are held in major cities across the country with Ankara also hosting a national parade in honor of the holiday. August 30 is the day of graduation ceremonies of military schools in Turkey. The Turkish Stars performs an airshow over Dumlupınar. In the evening, holiday concerts are held in major cities to honor the men and women of the Armed Forces. President of Turkey, acting as the Commander-in-chief, hosts an event at the Presidential Complex.

Celebration gallery

See also
Victory Day

References

External links

Turkey
Public holidays in Turkey
Public holidays in Northern Cyprus
August observances
Annual events in Turkey
Summer events in Turkey
Recurring events established in 1926
1926 establishments in Turkey